Bassa Vah, also known as simply vah ('throwing a sign' in Bassa) is an alphabetic script for writing the Bassa language of Liberia. Type was cast for it, and an association for its promotion was formed in Liberia in 1959. It is not used contemporarily and has been classified as a failed script.

Vah is a true alphabet, with 23 consonant letters, 7 vowel letters, and 5 tone diacritics, which are placed inside the vowels. It also has its own marks for commas and periods.

Letters 
The Bassa Vah script is written from left to right. A fullstop/period is represented with 𖫵.

Letters

Tones 
Bassa Vah uses 5 diacritical marks to denote tonality of its vowels. It distinguishes five tones: high, low, mid, mid-rising, and falling.

Unicode

The Bassa Vah alphabet was added to the Unicode Standard in June 2014 with the release of version 7.0.

The Unicode block for the Bassa alphabet is U+16AD0–U+16AFF:

References
Coulmas (1999) The Blackwell Encyclopedia of Writing Systems

External links
 Omniglot.com
 Proof of some of the origins 
 [www.yinda.de/bassa/script_history.html]

Bassa language
Writing systems of Africa
Scripts with ISO 15924 four-letter codes